Anadara tuberculosa is a species of bivalves belonging to the family Arcidae.

The species is found in the Americas, with its distribution ranging from Mexico to Peru. It lives in mangrove roots and has the common name mangrove cockle.

References

tuberculosa
Bivalves of North America
Marine fauna of South America
Bivalves described in 1833
Mangrove fauna